Helen Jeanne Grundlingh is a South African lawn bowler. She competed in the women's singles at the 2010 Commonwealth Games.

In 2011 she won the fours silver medal and triples bronze medal at the Atlantic Bowls Championships.

References

Living people
Bowls players at the 2010 Commonwealth Games
South African female bowls players
Year of birth missing (living people)